Slotervaart is a former district of Amsterdam, Netherlands. It had a population of 48,540 inhabitants in 2008 and an area of 11.14 km². As of 2010, Slotervaart is part of the newly formed stadsdeel Nieuw-West.

Slotervaart has a significant immigrant population; 33% of the inhabitants are from Morocco, 21% are from Turkey, and 5% are from Suriname. In 2007, Slotervaart youngsters burned cars and threw stones at the police after a stabbing accident at the Allebeplein, where the police killed a Moroccan boy.

At the edge of Slotervaart is the Sloterpark, a recreational location popular among young families with children, and also among men who have sex with men for whom the park is a famous cruising spot. The different clienteles traditionally frequent separate areas of the large park. Sometimes, homosexual tourists (who visit Slotervaart for its famous park) have not been aware of this distinction, and this has led to incidents of gay bashing. In early 2009 signs were erected pointing out the "family" and "cruising" areas.

Areas that were part of the borough included the smaller neighborhood of Slotervaart, Overtoomse Veld, and Nieuw Sloten.

External links

Schwule links, Heteros rechts - German news article about the Sloterpark

Amsterdam Nieuw-West
Former boroughs of Amsterdam